MS European Highlander may refer to a number of ships.

 European Highlander, a ferry previously named Salahala, Merchant Valiant and  Lion,  renamed European Mariner in 2001.
 , a ferry built in 2002.

Ship names